Bascharage-Sanem railway station is a railway station serving the towns of Bascharage and Sanem, in the south-west of Luxembourg. It is operated by Chemins de Fer Luxembourgeois, the state-owned railway company.

The station is situated on Line 70, which connects the south-west of the country to Luxembourg City.

Situation
At 338 yards altitude, the Bascharage - Sanem railway station is located at kilometric point 17,000 of line 7 from Luxembourg to Pétange between the stations of Schouweiler and Pétange.

History 
The Bascharage station was opened on September 8, 1900, by the Imperial Railways in Alsace-Lorraine.

The old building for travelers was destroyed after 1981. The station was entirely rebuilt and a second track added in 2010.

Passenger services
The station has no direct reception; however, it has several shelters and a parking lot.

CFL trains on line 70 (Regional-Express RE and Regionalbahn RB) between Luxembourg and Pétange or Rodange or Longwy stop at the station.

External links

 Official CFL page on Bascharage-Sanem station
 Rail.lu page on Bascharage-Sanem station

Bascharage
Railway stations in Luxembourg
Railway stations on CFL Line 70